The 2009-10 Premier Arena Soccer League season consists of 8 divisions of 43 teams across the US. The Premier Arena Soccer League continues to serve as the developmental league to the PASL-Pro.

Standings
As of March 8, 2010

(Bold Division Winner)

Division Playoffs
Rocky Mountain Division

Semifinals

Sat. Feb. 20: Edwards Freedom 8, Northern Colorado Cutthroats 7 (OT)

Sun. Feb. 21: Fort Collins Fury 9, Golden Strikers 3

Finals

Sun. Feb. 28: Fort Collins Fury 5, Edwards Freedom 3

South Central Division

Semifinals

Sat. Feb. 20: Vitesse Dallas 9, DFW Tornados 2

Sun. Feb. 21: Alamo City Warriors 12, Niño Soccer Club 10

Finals

Sat. Feb. 27: Vitesse Dallas 8, Alamo City Warriors 6

Northwest Division

Finals

Sat. Feb. 27: Tacoma Stars 6, Wenatchee Fire 1

Mid Atlantic Division

Finals

Sun. Feb. 28: Fredericksburg Generals 10, Winchester Impact 6

2009-10 PASL-Premier Finals (at Las Vegas, NV - Mar. 5-6)

Preliminary Round (March 5)

Knockout Round

References

Premier Arena Soccer League seasons
Premier Arena Soccer League
Premier Arena Soccer League